Polish National Government of 1831 was a Polish supreme authority during the November Uprising against the Russian occupation of the Polish–Lithuanian Commonwealth. It was formed by the decree of the Sejm (parliament) of the Congress Poland on 29 January 1831 to assume the competences of the Polish head of state in the follow-up of an earlier decree of 25 January: deposing the usurping Tsar Nicholas I of Russia from the throne of Poland.

The government concentrated on issues related to the fight with the Russian Empire. In August the government of Prince Adam Jerzy Czartoryski resigned, facing loss of support and radicalization among the Varsovians. Czartoryski was replaced by Jan Krukowiecki. After the capitulation of Warsaw the government was taken over by lawyer Bonawentura Niemojowski. After the government went into exile, it passed its powers to General Maciej Rybiński.

Presidents
Prince Adam Czartoryski 30 January-17 August 1831, head of Department of Foreign Affairs
Jan Krukowiecki 17 August-7 September 1831
Bonawentura Niemojowski 7–25 September 1831 (left the country with archives, refusing to capitulate)
General Maciej Rybiński 25 September-9 October 1831 (not a president per se, but a legal successor)

Others
Stanisław Barzykowski, head of Department of War, Drafts and Armaments
Alojzy Biernacki
Aleksander Bniński
Leon Dembowski
Kajetan Garbiński
Antoni Gliszczyński
Andrzej Horodyski
Joachim Lelewel, head of Department of Religion, Education and Justice
Franciszek Lewiński
Gustaw Małachowski
Teodor Morawski
Izydor Krasiński
Teofil Morawski, head of Department of Finance
Franciszek Morawski
Wincenty Niemojowski, head of Department of Administration and Police
Andrzej Plichta
Wiktor Rembieliński
Jan Olrych Szaniecki

References

1831 establishments in Poland
1831 disestablishments in Europe
Governments in Poland
November Uprising
Political history of Poland